Louis Lachenal (17 July 1921 – 25 November 1955), a French climber born in Annecy, Haute-Savoie, was one of the first two mountaineers to climb a summit of more than 8,000 meters.  On 3 June 1950 on the 1950 French Annapurna expedition, along with Maurice Herzog, he reached the summit of Annapurna I in Nepal at a height of 8,091 m (26,545 ft). Previously he had made the second ascent of the North Face of the Eiger in 1947, with Lionel Terray. He died falling into a snow-covered crevasse while skiing the Vallee Blanche in Chamonix. The mountain Pointe Lachenal in the Mont Blanc massif was named after him.

References

External links
"Tragic Study in French Movie Tells of Victory", 1953 Life Magazine account of their victorious climb.
"Louis Lachenal – The Star That Fell to Earth", article about his death.
"Mountain Claims Famous Climber", Life Magazine article about his death.

1921 births
1955 deaths
Sportspeople from Annecy
French mountain climbers
Skiing deaths
Sport deaths in France
Accidental deaths from falls